Allen B. DuMont Laboratories, Inc. (printed on products as Allen B. Du Mont Laboratories, Inc., commonly referred to as DuMont Laboratories, shortened to DuMont Labs; referred to on company documents as DuMont) was an American television equipment manufacturer and broadcasting company. At one point it owned TV stations WABD (now WNYW; FOX O&O), KCTY (defunct; DuMont affiliate), W2XVT (experimental; defunct; DuMont affiliate), KE2XDR (experimental; defunct; DuMont affiliate), & WDTV (now KDKA-TV; CBS O&O), as well as WTTG (FOX O&O), all former affiliates of its defunct DuMont Television Network.

The company was founded in 1931, in Upper Montclair, by inventor Allen B. DuMont, with its headquarters in nearby Clifton. Among the company's developments were durable cathode ray tubes (CRTs) that would be used for TV and its magic eye tube.

History

In 1938, DuMont Labs began manufacturing televisions at a factory in nearby Passaic, New Jersey. To sell TVs, it began the DuMont Television Network in 1942, one of the earliest TV networks. Later, they manufactured cameras and transmitters for TV. DuMont equipment was known for its high quality. The main CRT factory was in Clifton, New Jersey. It made black and white TV tubes as well as instrumentation and military fire control tubes in the early 1950s.

In 1956, under the ownership of Paramount, DuMont Labs shuttered the network and spun off WABD & WTTG to "DuMont Broadcasting Corporation". Eventually, the company was renamed "Metropolitan Broadcasting Company" in order to distance itself from the DuMont branding, which was seen as a failure. In 1958, John Kluge bought Paramount's stake in Metropolitan Broadcasting, renaming it to Metromedia. DuMont's partner, Thomas T. Goldsmith, remained on Metromedia's board of directors until the stations were sold to the Fox Television Stations Group. Nearly every original DuMont television program is considered lost, and presumed destroyed. Only roughly 100 recordings of any DuMont series have been recovered.

DuMont Labs eventually sold its TV manufacturing division to Emerson Radio in 1958. The remainder of the company merged into Fairchild Camera in 1960. Fairchild later developed semiconductor microchips. Robert Noyce, founder of Intel, originally worked for DuMont Labs as an engineer.

DuMont Labs TVs outside the US were assembled under license in Montreal, Quebec, Canada by Canadian Aviation Electronics, currently a manufacturer of flight simulator and pilot training equipment.

Name ownership

On April 18, 2012, a US federal trademark registration was filed for "Allen B. DuMont Laboratories, Inc." by Alan Levin of Cabin John, Maryland. The description provided to the United States Patent and Trademark Office for it is "Antennas for radio, for television; Electrical and optical cables; Electronic and optical communications instruments and components".

However, by June 5, 2020, the trademark registration for "Allen B. DuMont Laboratories, Inc." by Mr. Levin had lapsed, with the status having changed to "CONTINUED USE NOT FILED WITHIN GRACE PERIOD, UN-REVIVABLE", resulting in the trademark no longer being active, with a search on the United States Patent and Trademark Office website for the "Allen B. DuMont Laboratories, Inc." trademark confirming the trademark's status as "DEAD".

See also 
 Metromedia
 Passaic: Birthplace of Television and the DuMont Story

References

External links
 Dumont Experimental Color CRTs at the Early Television Museum
 DuMont television receiver photo at Greater Boston, June 2005 gallery of broadcasting equipment. Also available is Description and index of entire gallery.

Companies based in Passaic County, New Jersey
DuMont Television Network
Television in the United States
Mass media in New Jersey
Defunct broadcasting companies of the United States
1938 establishments in New Jersey 
1956 disestablishments in New Jersey
Defunct manufacturing companies based in New Jersey
Defunct television broadcasting companies of the_United_States